The Golden Key is a 1939 Soviet fairy-tale movie directed by Aleksandr Ptushko. It is based on the story of Pinocchio written by Carlo Collodi. In 2009, Russia TV adapted both the original & its remake into a musical

Plot 
The film tells about the adventures of Buratino and his friends. With the help of a golden key, they get to the magic book and fly to the country where all the children go to school and the old people live well.

Starring 
 Aleksandr Shchagin as Karabas Barabas (as A. Shchagin)
 Sergey Martinson as Duremar, village knave (as S. Martinson)
 Olga Shaganova-Obraztsova as Buratino (voice) (as O. Shaganova-Obraztsova)
 Georgiy Uvarov as Papa Carlo (as G. Uvarov)
 Nikolay Bogolyubov as Captain of the airship (as N. Bogolyubov)
 Mikhail Dagmarov as Giuseppe (as M. Dagmarov)
 Tamara Adelgeym as Malvina (voice) (as T. Adelgeym)
 R. Khairova as Pierrot (voice)
 Nikolai Michurin as Sandro (as N. Michurin)
 Konstantin Nikiforov as Puppet master (as K. Nikiforov)
 V. Pokorskaya as Puppet master
 F. Tikhonova as Puppet master
 Vasiliy Krasnoshchyokov as Policeman (uncredited)
 Georgiy Millyar as Clown (uncredited)

References

External links 

1939 films
1930s Russian-language films
Soviet black-and-white films
Soviet fantasy films
1930s fantasy films
Pinocchio films
Films with live action and animation